Debbagh (in Arabic : الدباغ) (in English: Debbagh, Debbarh, Dabbagh) is a Moroccan family name.

See also
 Atlas (mythology)
 Set (mythology)
 Amun-Ra
 Gurzil

Sources

 Pure gold,  (en)
 Paroles d'or,  (fr)
 Al-Ibriz, Arabic book, pages 7, 8, 41 and 213. Publishing house: Dar Arrashad Al Haditha 98, bd Victor Hugo Casablanca, MA - (First edition).
 Internal sources: (from Adam & Eve to Abraham & Hagar:Genealogies of genesis), (from Abraham to Muhammed:Adnan), (from Muhammed to king Idriss I:Idriss I

Surnames